Pickle Lake is a township in the Canadian province of Ontario, and is the most northerly community in the province that has year-round access by road. More northerly communities rely on winter roads for access and are cut off to land travel in the summer. Highway 599 meets the Northern Ontario Resource Trail, formerly Tertiary Highway 808, at Pickle Lake.

The Township of Pickle Lake has a population of 425 and its main industries are transportation (by air and land) and tourism. Pickle Lake Airport serves as the supply point to northern First Nations. It is an access point for animal watching, with many opportunities to view moose, woodland caribou, timber wolf, black bear, game birds, bald eagles, song birds, and migratory birds such as ducks and geese. It is also a popular fishing and hunting destination. The town is sometimes referred to as the gateway to Ontario's "Last Frontier" because of its remote location. Pickle Lake has its own detachment of the Ontario Provincial Police.

The community is located on the north-east shore of Pickle Lake, from which it takes its name.

History
Pickle Lake was founded as a local transportation centre for mining activities after gold was discovered nearby in 1928. From that time until 1995 over 2.5 million ounces of gold were produced in the area. Copper was also mined near Pickle Lake in the 1970s. Exploration for gold and copper in the Pickle Lake area continues to this day.

Jack Hammell's Pickle Crow Gold Mines (1935–1961) produced 1,446,214 ounces of gold.  Alex and Murdoch Mosher's Central Patricia Mine (1927–1951) produced 621,806 ounces.

Pickle Lake was incorporated as a township in 1980. It got its name from the shape of the lake which resembled a cucumber, or 'Pickle'.

The township also includes the former townsites of Central Patricia and Pickle Crow. Both formerly independent settlements, Central Patricia now consists only of a few buildings located at the terminus of Highway 599 within the township, while Pickle Crow is a ghost town. After the Pickle Crow gold mine was shut down in 1966, the Ministry of Natural Resources set fire to the site as part of its program to clean up abandoned mines.

Demographics 

Historic populations:
 Population in 2016: 386 (−8.7% from 2011)
 Population in 2011: 425 (−11.3% from 2006)
 Population in 2006: 479 (+20.1% from 2001)
 Population in 2001: 399
 Population in 1996: 544
 Population in 1991: 654

Climate
Pickle Lake has a humid continental climate that closely borders on a subarctic climate (Köppen Dfb/Dfc), and did have a subarctic climate based on 30-year means as late as 1961 to 1990 before the most extreme impacts of anthropogenic global warming. Snowfall averages  with reliable cover from November to April. There are 17.3 nights where the temperature will drop below .

There are 4.8 days where the temperature will exceed . Precipitation tends to be higher during the summer months, with each month from June to August averaging 16 days with measurable precipitation.

Media

Pickle Lake's only local media service is the new CJTL-FM, which airs a mixed Christian radio and First Nations format. The region is otherwise served through rebroadcasters of services from larger cities such as Thunder Bay, Toronto and Winnipeg.

Radio
 FM 96.5 – CJTL-FM, Christian radio/First Nations
 FM 98.5 – CFDK-FM, (defunct)
 FM 105.1 – CBQP-FM, CBC Radio One (relays CBQT-FM, Thunder Bay)

See also
List of townships in Ontario

References

External links

Mining communities in Ontario
Municipalities in Kenora District
Single-tier municipalities in Ontario
Township municipalities in Ontario